This is a list of the wool, cotton and other textile mills in Kirklees: Including the towns of Dewsbury, Huddersfield with Batley, Spenborough, Heckmondwike and Holmfirth.

Batley

Denby (Denby Dale)

Dewsbury

Golcar (Colne Valley; Huddersfield)

Gomersal (Batley; Gomersal)

Holmfirth

Heckmondwike

Huddersfield

Kirkburton

Kirkheaton (Kirkburton)

Lepton (Kirkburton)

Lingards (Colne)

Linthwaite (Colne Valley; Huddersfield)

Liversedge

Lockwood (Huddersfield)

Longwood (Colne Valley; Huddersfield)

Marsden

Meltham

Mirfield

Scammonden (Colne Valley; Elland)

Shelley (Kirkburton)

Shepley (Kirkburton)

Slaithwaite (Colne Valley)

Soothill (Batley; Dewsbury)

South Crosland (Huddersfield; Meltham)

See also
Heavy Woollen District
Textile processing

References

Footnotes

The National Monument Record is a legacy numbering system maintained by English Heritage.

Notes

Bibliography

External links

 01
Kirklees
Buildings and structures in Kirklees
Kirklees
History of the textile industry
Industrial Revolution in England